Bloody Mary is a 2006 horror thriller film written and directed by Richard Valentine and starring Jaason Simmons, Kim Tyler, Matt Borlenghi, and Cory Monteith. The film had a negative critical reception.

Plot

The film begins with a group of nurses at a psychiatric hospital daring a fellow nurse, Nicole (Jessica Von), to go into the hospital's basement for a game of Bloody Mary. Playing what the others call "The Mirror Game", she releases the vengeful spirit and is snatched away. When Nicole is reported missing, her writer/reporter sister Natalie (Kim Tyler) decides to investigate on her own.

As the film progresses, more people are killed by the spirit of Bloody Mary (Richard Valentine) in gruesome ways while Natalie uncovers clues about the truth behind her sister's disappearance and Mary herself.

Near the end, almost all of the main characters are dead except for Natalie, who discovers that Bloody Mary is actually her mother.

Cast
 Kim Tyler ...	Natalie
 Matthew Borlenghi	... Bobby
 Danni Hamilton ... Jenna
 Troy Turi ...	Johnny
 Christian Schrapff ... Scooter
 Amber Borycki	... Tabitha
 Cory Monteith ...	Paul
 Richard Carmen ... Dr. McCarty
 Eero Johnson ... Railroad
 Dex Manley ... Luther
 Jason Benson ... Geoff
 Anna Pippus ... Hilary
 Lindsay Marett ... April
 Brianne Wigeland ... Shelby
 Jaason Simmons ... Dr. Daniels
 Jessica Lous ... Nicole
 Sandra Steier ... Voice of Mary / Margaret
 Shane David ... News Reporter

Reception

Critical response to the film was generally negative, with the film receiving heavy criticism of the plot. Steve "Uncle Creepy" Barton of Dread Central rated the film 2/5 stars and said of the film: "there's ... some good acting, killer sound design, spooky ghost effects, and a decent amount of nudity and gore. It's a real shame all that goodness gets lost in a semi-coherent abyss of confusion."  Dave Murray of Joblo.com rated the film 1.5/4 stars and said that it was "fun to watch once" but not a film that he could recommend.  Christopher Null of Contactmusic.com said, "There are nuggets of what might be something worth watching in all of this, but they come through only faintly and in short bursts."

See also
Bloody Mary folklore in popular culture

References

External links

2006 films
2006 horror films
Films based on urban legends
American supernatural horror films
2000s English-language films
2000s American films